Japanese military currency may refer to:

Japanese military currency (1894–1918), issued during the Meiji and Taishō period
Japanese military currency (1937–1945), issued during World War II
Japanese invasion money, issued during World War II by the Japanese Military Authority